Steele County is a county in the U.S. state of North Dakota. As of the 2020 census, the population was 1,798, making it the fifth-least populous county in North Dakota. Its county seat since 1919 is Finley.

History
The Dakota Territory legislature created the county on June 2, 1883, with territories partitioned from Griggs and Traill counties. It was not organized at that time, but was attached to Traill for administrative and judicial purposes. It was named for businessman Edward H. Steele, who had pushed for its creation.

On July 13, 1883, the county organization was effected and Steele County was detached from Traill County; Sherbrooke, North Dakota was chosen as the county seat. In 1897 the town of Finley was founded, and by 1919 its growth had eclipsed Sherbrooke to the point that the county seat was transferred to Finley. The county's boundaries have been unchanged since its creation.

Geography
The Sheyenne River flows south near and into the county's west boundary line. The Goose River flows southeast through the northeastern part of the county. The terrain consists of rolling hills dotted with lakes and ponds. The area is devoted to agriculture. The terrain slopes to the south and east; its highest point is near its northwestern corner, at 1,562' (464m) ASL.

Major highways
  North Dakota Route 32
  North Dakota Route 38
  North Dakota Route 200

Adjacent counties

 Grand Forks County - north
 Traill County - east
 Cass County - southeast
 Barnes County - southwest
 Griggs County - west
 Nelson County - northwest

Lakes

 Golden Lake
 Golden Rush Lake
 Lake Tobiason
 Lone Tree Lake
 North Golden Lake
 Stony Lake
 Willow Lake

Demographics

2000 census
As of the 2000 census, there were 2,258 people, 923 households, and 635 families in the county. The population density was 3 people per square mile (1/km2).  There were 1,231 housing units at an average density of 2 per square mile (1/km2). The racial makeup of the county was 98.32% White, 0.04% Black or African American, 0.62% Native American, 0.04% Asian, 0.22% from other races, and 0.75% from two or more races. 0.18% of the population were Hispanic or Latino of any race. 60.7% were of Norwegian and 15.6% German ancestry.

There were 923 households, out of which 29.70% had children under the age of 18 living with them, 62.30% were married couples living together, 4.40% had a female householder with no husband present, and 31.20% were non-families. 28.30% of all households were made up of individuals, and 13.10% had someone living alone who was 65 years of age or older. The average household size was 2.45 and the average family size was 3.01.

The county population contained 27.60% under the age of 18, 4.70% from 18 to 24, 23.10% from 25 to 44, 25.00% from 45 to 64, and 19.60% who were 65 years of age or older. The median age was 41 years. For every 100 females there were 107.20 males. For every 100 females age 18 and over, there were 108.70 males.

The median income for a household in the county was $35,757, and the median income for a family was $43,914. Males had a median income of $30,104 versus $20,694 for females. The per capita income for the county was $17,601. About 5.00% of families and 7.10% of the population were below the poverty line, including 8.00% of those under age 18 and 3.60% of those age 65 or over.

2010 census
As of the 2010 census, there were 1,975 people, 864 households, and 589 families in the county. The racial makeup of the county was 97.6% white, 1.2% American Indian, 0.2% black or African American, 0.1% Asian, 0.4% from other races, and 0.6% from two or more races. Those of Hispanic or Latino origin made up 1.0% of the population. In terms of ancestry, 60.0% were Norwegian, 35.2% were German, 5.4% were Irish, and 1.0% were American.

Of the 864 households, 24.7% had children under the age of 18 living with them, 59.4% were married couples living together, 4.5% had a female householder with no husband present, 31.8% were non-families, and 27.8% of all households were made up of individuals. The average household size was 2.29 and the average family size was 2.78. The median age was 47.7 years.

The median income for a household in the county was $44,191 and the median income for a family was $54,625. Males had a median income of $36,588 versus $25,648 for females. The per capita income for the county was $27,728. About 4.3% of families and 4.2% of the population were below the poverty line, including 7.1% of those under age 18 and 5.1% of those age 65 or over.

Communities

Cities

 Finley (county seat)
 Hope
 Luverne
 Sharon

Unincorporated communities

 Blabon
  Colgate
 Pickert
 Sherbrooke (original county seat; now mostly uninhabited)

Townships

 Beaver Creek
 Broadlawn
 Carpenter
 Colgate
 Easton
 Edendale
 Enger
 Finley
 Franklin
 Golden Lake
 Greenview
 Hugo
 Melrose
 Newburgh
 Primrose
 Riverside
 Sharon
 Sherbrooke
 Westfield
 Willow Lake

Politics
Steele County was a Democratic-leaning swing county in presidential elections until 2016, when Hillary Clinton lost to Donald Trump by nearly 20 points, an almost total flip from Barack Obama's 20 point win in 2008. In 2020, Joe Biden fared even worse despite a national increase for the Democratic party from 2016. He was the first Democrat to win without the county since John F. Kennedy in 1960, and had the lowest proportion of the county's vote of any winning Democrat since Woodrow Wilson in 1912. Since 1964 Steele County has favored the Democratic presidential candidate in 64% of elections.

Education
Steele County has the following school districts:
 Dakota Prairie Public School District 1
 Finley-Sharon Public School District 19
 Griggs County Central School District 18
 Hatton Public School District 7
 Hope-Page School District (merger of Hope Public School District 10 and Page Public School District 80)
 May-Port CG Public School District 14
 Northwood Public School District 129

Former districts:
 Hope Public School District 10 - Consolidated with Page district in 2020
 Page Public School District 80 - Consolidated with Hope district in 2020

In 1964 the county had 992 students in four schools; at the time there were five school districts but Colgate was not operating any schools as its school closed in 1964.

See also
 National Register of Historic Places listings in Steele County, North Dakota

References

External links
 Steele County map, North Dakota DOT

 
1883 establishments in Dakota Territory
Populated places established in 1883